Busoga College Mwiri, commonly known as Busoga College, is a boarding secondary school located in Uganda.

Location
Busoga College Mwiri is located on Mwiri Hill in Wairaka Parish, Kakira Town Council-Jinja District, Eastern Region of Uganda, adjacent and to the immediate west of the town of Kakira. The coordinates of Busoga College are 0°29'55.0"N, 33°15'48.0"E (Latitude0.498611; Longitude:33.263333).

Overview
The all-boys boarding school was founded by the Church Missionary Society, who later turned it over to the Church of Uganda. The school receives funding from Uganda's Ministry of Education, thus meeting the classification as a public school. It is one of the prominent middle and high schools (Senior Secondary Schools), in Uganda. The country's first Prime Minister, the late Milton Obote, attended Busoga College Mwiri.

History
Busoga College was founded on 25 September 1911, as Balangira High School, to educate the sons of Busoga Chiefs. Initially, the school was housed in Kamuli. Between 1920 and 1930, plans were made to move the school to Mwiri Hill because of more space and newer, better infrastructure. The school also opened to sons of non-chiefs. Between 1930 and 1933, the school temporarily relocated to Kings College Budo in Wakiso District because of the poor accommodations at Kamuli. In 1933, the school permanently relocated to its present premises at Mwiri Hill. In 1967, a proposal was made to merge Busoga College with nearby Wanyange Girls School. The following year, however, the Busoga College Old Boys Association rejected the proposal and the idea was abandoned.

Prominent alumni

The prominent men who have attended Busoga College Mwiri include the following:
Milton Obote: The first prime minister of Uganda (1962 to 1966). President of Uganda (1966 to 1971) and (1980 to 1985). Deposed twice from power via coup d'état by Idi Amin in 1971 and by Tito Okello in 1985.
 George Kirya: Physician, academic, microbiologist, politician, and diplomat. Professor of microbiology at Makerere University Medical School from 1978 until 1986. Was vice chancellor of Makerere University from 1986 until 1990. Was Uganda's high commissioner to the United Kingdom from 1997 to 2003. Chairman of the Uganda Health Services Commission from 2005 until 2012.
 Ruhakana Rugunda: Physician, politician, and diplomat. Prime minister of Uganda since 2014. Was minister of health in Uganda from May 2013 until September 2014. Minister of information communication technology from 2011 until 2003. Uganda's permanent representative at the United Nations from January 2009 until May 2011.
 Daniel Kalinaki: journalist
 Joshua Wanume Kibedi: lawyer, politician and diplomat, who served as the Foreign Minister between January 1971 and January 1973
 Ernest Kiiza: politician
 Kirunda Kivejinja: Zoologist and politician. Second deputy prime minister and minister of east African community affairs since 6 June 2016.
 Nandala Mafabi: accountant, lawyer, and politician
 Philemon Mateke: politician
 Andrew Mwenda: journalist and community activist. He is the owner and editor of The Independent (Uganda), a weekly Ugandan newsmagazine.
 James Mutende: Ugandan veterinarian, economist, academic, and politician. He was the state minister of industry in the Ugandan cabinet from 27 May 2011 until his death.
 Barnabas Nawangwe: architect, academic and current vice chancellor of Makerere University
 Henry Osinde: cricketer
 Francis Ayume: Former attorney general of Uganda and one time speaker of the Parliament of Uganda.
 Madoxx Ssemanda Sematimba: Ugandan roots reggae musician
 John Walugembe: business executive, economist, author, entrepreneur and scientist
 Wilber Kakaire: Youth social worker, activist and champion of Sustainable Development Goals in Uganda. He was the only youth delegate from Uganda at the launch of Global Goals at the UNGA in 2015
John Mikloth Magoola Luwuliza-Kirunda: Physician and Ugandan Political figure, serving as secretary general of the Uganda People's Congress and as List of Ministers of Internal Affairs of Uganda and List of Ministers of Foreign Affairs of Uganda
Ernest Obitre Gama: Lieutenant Colonel in the Uganda People's Defence Force and Minister of Internal Affairs under Idi Amin
 James Zikusoka: civil engineer, who served as the Cabinet Minister of Works and Transport from 1971 until 1972

References

External links 
  Website of Busoga College Mwiri
 Busoga College Mwiri: The School That Was

 Boarding schools in Uganda
 Educational institutions established in 1911
 Boys' schools in Uganda
 Jinja District
 1911 establishments in Uganda